The 1955 edition of the Campeonato Carioca kicked off on August 7, 1955 and ended on April 4, 1956. It was organized by FMF (Federação Metropolitana de Futebol, or Metropolitan Football Federation). Twelve teams participated. Flamengo won the title for the 13th time. no teams were relegated.

System
The tournament would be divided in two stages:
 First phase: The twelve teams all played against each other in a double round-robin format. The six best teams qualified to the Third round (The first and second rounds were part of the First phase). The team with the most points qualified to the Finals.
 Third round: The remaining six teams all played in a single round-robin format against each other. The team with the most points qualified to the Finals.
 Finals: The finals would be disputed in a best-of-three-points series. In case the same team won all three rounds, it won the title automatically.

Championship

First phase

Third round

Finals

Top Scores

References

Campeonato Carioca seasons
Carioca